Ochrosia glomerata is a species of tree in the family Apocynaceae.

Description
The bark is pale greyish brown to blackish brown. Inflorescences bear up to four fragrant flowers. The flowers feature a white corolla.

Distribution and habitat
Ochrosia glomerata is native to Borneo, the Philippines, islands of eastern Indonesia, New Guinea and the Solomon Islands. Its habitat is primary and secondary forests from sea-level to  altitude.

References

glomerata
Flora of Malesia
Flora of Papuasia
Plants described in 1850
Taxa named by Carl Ludwig Blume